Émilie Loit and Nicole Pratt were the defending champions, but both chose not to participate that year.

Elena Likhovtseva and Elena Vesnina won in the final against Anabel Medina Garrigues and Virginia Ruano Pascual, 2-6, 6-1, 6-2.

Seeds

 Anabel Medina Garrigues   Virginia Ruano Pascual (final)
 Maria Elena Camerin   Gisela Dulko (semifinals)
 Iveta Benešová   Michaëlla Krajicek (quarterfinals)
 Elena Likhovtseva   Elena Vesnina (champions)

Draw

Draw

External links
 ITF tournament edition details

Hobart International – Doubles
Dou